Avetis Vardan Nazarbekian (1866, Tabriz – 1939, Moscow), also known as Nazarbek or Lerents, was an Armenian poet, journalist, political activist and revolutionary, one of the founders of Social Democrat Hunchakian Party.

Biography
Nazarbekian was born in Tabriz, Qajar Iran, but had lived in Imperial Russia since his childhood. He studied at the St. Petersburg and Paris (Sorbonne) Universities. In the mid-1880s he contributed to the Mkrtich Portukalian's Armenia revolutionary journal, also established close contacts with Russian socialist Georgi Plekhanov and Emancipation of Labour group. In 1887 Nazarbek, his future wife Mariam Vardanian and their Russian-Armenian friends founded the Hunchakian party and Hunchak newspaper.

Nazarbek translated several works of Karl Marx, Friedrich Engels and Plekhanov. He talked to Lenin and Shahumyan about the Armenian question. In 1923 he moved from Paris to the United States and joined the US Communist (Workers) Party.

In 1934 he returned to the Soviet Union.

Books
(in English) Through the Storm, London, 1899
(in Armenian) Poems, Saint Petersburg, 1890

References

External links
Avetis Nazarbekian's biography

1866 births
1939 deaths
People from Tabriz
Persian Armenians
Armenian people from the Russian Empire
Soviet Armenians
Iranian emigrants to the Russian Empire
University of Paris alumni
Saint Petersburg State University alumni
19th-century Armenian poets
Poets from the Russian Empire
Armenian male writers
Armenian male poets
Armenian revolutionaries
Social Democrat Hunchakian Party politicians
Armenian journalists
Journalists from the Russian Empire
Armenian translators
Translators from the Russian Empire
Soviet translators
Members of the Communist Party USA